A pixie cut is a short hairstyle, generally short on the back and sides of the head and slightly longer on the top, with very short bangs. It is a variant of a crop. The name is derived from the mythological pixie.

History
Pixie cuts were popularized first in the 1950s when Audrey Hepburn wore the style in her debut film Roman Holiday,  and later in the 1960s by actress Mia Farrow (notably in Roman Polanski’s Rosemary's Baby), British supermodel Twiggy, and then even later by Laugh-In star Goldie Hawn. Jean Seberg also sported a pixie cut for Otto Preminger's Bonjour Tristesse and Jean-Luc Godard’s Breathless.

The crop became fashionable again in the late 1970s and 1980s, with one of its most notable wearers being the actress Jacqueline Pearce in the British TV series Blake's 7. The crop also was big in the mid 1990s, and Halle Berry appeared in the 2002 James Bond film Die Another Day wearing a crop. Pixies are very easy to maintain and can be worn casually, or dressed up for special occasions.

In popular culture
Columnist Pamela Hutchinson notes that the pixie hairstyle is often portrayed in films in a negative way, usually had when actors play characters that have been traumatized, imprisoned or are undergoing cancer treatment.

Gallery

See also
 Hime cut
 Pageboy
 List of hairstyles

References

External links
 
 

Hairstyles
1950s fashion
1960s fashion
21st-century fashion
2020s fashion